Tang-e Shuhan-e Olya (also Romanized as Tang-e Shūhān-e ‘Olyā and Tang-e Showhān-e ‘Olyā; also known as Tang-e Shīān, Tang-e Shūhān, Tang-e Shūhān-e Bālā, and Tang-i-Shuwan) is a village in Hasanabad Rural District, in the Central District of Eslamabad-e Gharb County, Kermanshah Province, Iran. At the 2006 census, its population was 527, in 125 families.

References 

Populated places in Eslamabad-e Gharb County